This article describes the qualifying phase for gymnastics at the 2020 Summer Olympics .

The qualification system underwent a significant revision following the 2016 Summer Olympics in Rio. The team events in artistic gymnastics will be reduced from five members to four, but a maximum of two further places will be available for competitors in individual events, in principle allowing one or two athletes per National Olympic Committee (NOC) to enter as specialists.

In a further move to link FIG competitions to the Olympics, it will now be possible to qualify for the Olympics on the basis of an aggregate of scores achieved over the Artistic Gymnastics World Cup series and the various continental artistic gymnastics championships.

Timeline

Qualification summary
The table below lists the numbers of men and women from each NOC who have qualified for the gymnastics events at the 2020 Olympics.

Artistic

Men's events

Team places

Individual quotas

Women's events
Team places

Individual quotas

Rhythmic

Individual all-around

Group all-around

Trampoline

Men's events

Both the host quota and the tripartie quota were redistributed, as Japan qualified already and no eligible tripartie eligible countries competed at the 2019 Worlds.

Women's events

Notes

References

Qualification
Qualification for the 2020 Summer Olympics